Francis Pelham may refer to:
 Francis Pelham, 5th Earl of Chichester, British cleric and nobleman
 Francis Pelham, 7th Earl of Chichester, British nobleman